Feprazone (or prenazone)  is a drug used for joint and muscular pain.

It is an analog of butazone but instead of a n-butyl group it is prenylated.

References 

Nonsteroidal anti-inflammatory drugs
Pyrazolidindiones